Lee Min-young (born June 21, 1991), better known by her stage name Min, is a South Korean singer, television personality, songwriter, and actress. She is best known as a former member of the South Korean girl group Miss A.

Early life
Min was born in Seoul, South Korea on June 21, 1991. At a young age she took part in BoBoBo (the Korean equivalent of Sesame Street), as part of the duo called Eolleong Ddungddang. At 13 years old, she and Girls' Generation member Hyoyeon formed a dance duo called Little Winners. Min auditioned for JYP Entertainment when she was in the 6th grade. After a year of training, she was sent to the U.S. to prepare for a U.S. debut, and studied at the Repertory Company High School for Theatre Arts in Manhattan, New York City.

Career

For Min's U.S. debut, Park Jin-young teamed up with Lil Jon in the production of her album. She released three solo singles in 2007 and 2008: Dance Like This, Go Ahead and Boyfriend.

Miss A

Min marked her official debut in South Korea as part of the four-member girl group Miss A on July 1, 2010 with the release of the single Bad Girl Good Girl from their debut EP Bad But Good. It remains their most renowned and successful song to date. In November 2017, it was reported that Min has departed from the group as her contract with JYP Entertainment has come to an end.

Solo activities 
After Miss A's formal promotions ended for "Bad Girl Good Girl", Min collaborated with label mate San E for his debut single "Tasty San". She joined him on his debut stages on various music shows for the month of September. Min was then selected to be a part of the G20 Seoul Summit that was held in November 2010. She was chosen to sing with 20 various idols from 2PM, 2AM, Girls' Generation, BEAST, MBLAQ and more for its theme song. The recording was done separately for two days and one day for all the participants to gather for the recording of the chorus. The song, entitled Let's Go, was released through a number of online music charts on October 15, 2010.

In October 2010, Min was cast as a fixed member of Oh! My School, a South Korean variety show broadcast by KBS until its end in May 2011. It was during this time that Min was able to showcase her renowned "kkab" dancing and variety skills. On an episode of Oh! My School, Min had confided in her fellow cast members that at one point, she had given up life as a trainee. Disheartened from the recurring delays and uncertainties of her U.S. debut, she had returned to South Korea. Min had cut off contact with her family for one and a half years, during which time she supported herself by teaching dance and English lessons.

Min made her acting debut in the 2011 South Korean caper film Countdown alongside screen veterans Jung Jae-young and Jeon Do-yeon. She played the role of Hyeon-ji, the estranged and rebellious young daughter of the charismatic fraudster Cha Ha-yeon.

In August 2016, Min collaborated with childhood friends Hyoyeon of Girls' Generation and Jo Kwon of 2AM to form the co-ed project group Triple T. The trio released their debut single titled "Born to be Wild", featuring Park Jin-young, as part of SM Entertainment's ongoing weekly Station music project.

It was revealed in September 2016 that Min would be making her return to the big screen with the movie Sooni: The Executioner's Daughter. Although originally planned for a Summer 2017 release in South Korea, the current status of the movie production is unknown.

In January 2017, the cast of the Korean adaptation of Boys Over Flowers The Musical was revealed, with representatives of the production announcing that Min would be making her musical debut with the star role of Tsukushi Makino. The musical opened on February 24 and had its final curtain call on May 7 at Hongik University Art Center's Grand Theater in Seoul.

On May 22, 2019, it was revealed that Min has signed an exclusive contract with her new agency K-Tigers E&C. On November 8, 2021, Min released her first official solo pre-debut digital single "Onion". On April 18, 2022, Min released her second digital single "Hit Me Up". On September 5, 2022, Min released her third digital single "To The Beach".

On August 22, 2022, Min was confirmed to be making her Broadway debut in Manhattan with the K-pop inspired musical KPOP. Inspired by the global music phenomenon, it will feature multiple real life K-pop stars. Min will be portraying Riya, a member of the fictional K-pop girl group RTMIS. The musical is scheduled to make its Broadway debut in the fall of 2022 at Circle in the Square Theatre.

Discography

Singles

Songwriting and composing credits

Filmography

Drama

Film

Variety shows

Musical theatre

See also
 Koreans in New York City

Notes

References

External links

Living people
1991 births
Miss A members
English-language singers from South Korea
JYP Entertainment artists
K-pop singers
Mandarin-language singers of South Korea
People from Seoul
South Korean dance musicians
South Korean female dancers
South Korean female idols
South Korean women pop singers
South Korean television actresses
South Korean television personalities